A pixel is the base element of a digital image in computer graphics.

Pixel may also refer to:

Technology
 Google Pixel, a line of consumer electronics devices that run ChromeOS or the Android operating system, including:
 Chromebook Pixel, a touchscreen chromebook laptop from Google
 Pixel C, a 2015 Android tablet from Google
 Pixel Slate, the 2018 succeeding model
 Pixel Tablet
 Pixel (smartphone), Android phones
 Pixel (1st generation) (2016)
 Pixel 2 (2017)
 Pixel 3 (2018)
 Pixel 3a (2019)
 Pixel 4 (2019)
 Pixel 4a (2020)
 Pixel 5 (2020)
 Pixel 5a (2021)
 Pixel 6 (2021)
 Pixel 6a (2022)
 Pixel 7 (2022)
 Pixel Watch
 Quad (rocket), a VTOL rocket known as Pixel, developed in 2006 by Armadillo Aerospace

Entertainment
 Pixels (2010 film), a French animated short
 Pixels (2015 film), an American science fiction comedy film starring Adam Sandler based on the 2010 short film
 Pixel (band), a Norwegian experimental jazz band
 Pixel (board game), a Mensa select board game
 Pixel (LazyTown), a fictional character good with technology
 Pixel (webcomic), a webcomic written by Chris Dlugosz
 Pixel, a fictional cat from Robert A. Heinlein's novel The Cat Who Walks Through Walls
 Pixel (game developer), the art name of Daisuke Amaya, creator of the freeware game Cave Story
 Pixel (magazine), the Polish magazine dedicated to video games and pop-culture

Other uses
 IP Pixel, a Chicago-based interactive advertising agency

See also
 Tracking pixel, a web bug, a method to track user behavior on web sites 
 Pixl (disambiguation)
 Pixel Art